Zhongxing Bridge South Station is an underground metro station of Line 3 in Ningbo, Zhejiang, China. It is located on the crossing of Zhongxing North Road and Jiangdong North Road north. It  opened on 30 June 2019.

Exits 
Zhongxing Bridge South Station has two main exits.

References 

Railway stations in Zhejiang
Ningbo Rail Transit stations
Railway stations in China opened in 2019